John Morse represented Dedham, Massachusetts in the Great and General Court.

References

Works cited

Members of the colonial Massachusetts General Court from Dedham
Year of birth missing
Year of death missing
Signers of the Dedham Covenant